The Regina Airport Authority is the not-for-profit agency that oversees the management of the Regina International Airport, which serves the Canadian city of Regina, and the entire southern part of the province of Saskatchewan, a region that contains about 495,000 people. The Regina Airport Authority was founded in 1997 in Regina. The authority was created due to a policy beginning in the 1990s under the Liberal federal government of turning over the operation of major Canadian airports to locally based bodies—though Ottawa retains ownership of the airports.

The Regina Airport Authority's current board chairman is Sean McEchern.

See also

 Greater Toronto Airports Authority and Toronto Port Authority
 Edmonton Airports
 Vancouver Airport Services
 Halifax International Airport Authority

References

External links
 About RAA

Airport operators of Canada
Companies based in Regina, Saskatchewan
Transport in Regina, Saskatchewan
1997 establishments in Saskatchewan